Lamar High School is a four-year public high school located in Lamar, South Carolina.  Approximately 250 students attend the school.

Athletics 
Lamar High School is home to the Silver Foxes. The school competes in SCHSL Division A Region 6.

State championships 
 Baseball: 2003
 Football: 2002, 2003, 2004, 2015, 2017
 Track - Boys: 1998, 1999, 2000, 2001, 2002, 2003, 2004, 2005
 Track - Girls: 1980, 1981, 1982, 1983, 2004, 2007

Notable alumni
Cobie Durant, NFL defensive back
B. J. Goodson, NFL linebacker
John Abraham, NFL defensive end
Marshall McFadden, NFL linebacker
Michael Hamlin, NFL defensive back
Levon Kirkland, NFL linebacker
David Beasley, 113th South Carolina Governor

References

Public high schools in South Carolina
Schools in Darlington County, South Carolina
Education in Darlington County, South Carolina